Twisted ToyFare Theatre (TTT) was a popular, humorous comic strip in the monthly magazine ToyFare. Originally titled Twisted Mego Theatre, it predominantly featured  scale action figures made by the Mego Corporation (a line very popular in the 1970s, during the childhood years of much of the magazine's staff), and principally those based on Marvel Comics characters, such as Spider-Man ("Mego Spidey") and the Incredible Hulk.  The artwork was done in the fumetti style by photographing toys on sets built by the magazine's staff, and using Photoshop to add effects and word balloons. The series was known for its bizarre humor and pop-culture references.

Publication history 
Twisted Mego Theatre debuted in ToyFare's 1996 Winter Special. The strip ended when ToyFare published its final issue in January 2011.

Plot and characters
Collectively, the strips take place in a fictional world called Megoville.

Mego toys based on other properties, such as television shows like CHiPs, Star Trek, and The Dukes of Hazzard make frequent appearances alongside the Marvel characters. Originally, Mego toys based on DC Comics characters also appeared, but legal issues led to their removal. Reprints of strips featuring DC characters were edited so that other characters appeared in their place.

The broad scope of Twisted ToyFare Theatre called for the appearance of characters/figures never officially released by Mego. This led the strip's creators to commission customized figures for those characters, or to do their best with existing figures, the latter case resulting in such "customized" characters as "John Denver" (actually a Bo Duke Mego figure wearing glasses) or Iceman's "Snowman" incarnation represented as a Mego figure covered in modeling clay and rolled in shredded coconut.

Additionally, a large variety of other toy lines were featured, either independently, or alongside the Megoville characters. These lines included Star Wars, Smurfs, Transformers, G.I. Joe, Masters of the Universe, Gobots, and a host of others. The Marvel Mego characters also met their "evil twins" twice, in the form of the other toy lines based on Marvel characters, such as Marvel Legends.

While Twisted ToyFare Theatre features toys based on pre-existing characters, their personalities were usually caricatures of the original; writer Doug Goldstein said a favorite technique of his was to take some facet of their personality and twist it just slightly, making it ludicrous while still being true to the character:

Spider-Man (referred to as "Mego Spidey" by fans and ToyFare staffers) — often acts as the central character.  Sarcastic and slightly self-centered, he remains aloof of the troubles of others and usually wants nothing to do with whatever craziness is affecting everyone else (in stark contrast to the real character's motto of “with great power comes great responsibility”).
The Hulk — Mego Spidey's dim-witted and childlike constant companion (much to Mego Spidey's annoyance and disgust) and is usually a source of scatological humor.  During the Megoville Civil War, the Hulk is launched into space by Iron Man in exchange for Mego Spidey siding with the pro-prohibition heroes. In a parody of the "Planet Hulk" storyline, it was revealed in the July 2008 issue that the Hulk becomes king of the world he lands on, but returns to Earth after his newfound wife is killed in an explosion (which he causes by placing metal in the spaceship's microwave).
Aunt May — a senile and slightly overbearing old woman who refuses to die (much to Mego Spidey's eternal chagrin).
Bucky — Captain America's sidekick/errand boy.  Most of Megoville considers him nothing short of a loser and joke. After Cap dies, Nick Fury teaches Bucky to be a gritty anti-hero, despite his incredible ineptness, to the point that even the Megoville villains consider him to be not so much of a twerp.
George W. Bush — the mayor of Megoville.
Captain America — presented as a nationalistic, slightly bigoted man out of touch with the current generation.  Following the real Cap's death in Marvel Comics, Mego Cap is accidentally killed by the Red Skull, Mysterio, Electro, and the Lizard during a drunken binge.  However, he appears alive and well two issues later, albeit without an explanation for his resurrection.
Captain Kirk — an unrepentant womanizer whose shirt keeps disappearing and reappearing.
Cobra Commander — of G.I. Joe fame, seems to have set up a secondary headquarters in Spider-Man's house, much to Spider-Man's frustration and annoyance.  He has a regular Wednesday night game of Risk with Gargamel, Megatron and Skeletor and is a comically inept leader to the point that the other members of Cobra like to draw mustaches on his faceplate while he is sleeping. In an early 2008 issue, Cobra Commander joins G.I Joe after losing control of Cobra to Dr. Mindbender's fast food mogul/world conqueror clone BurgerMeister, and changes his name to Private Commander. Predictably, his ineptness causes the Joes more harm than when he was their opponent and Duke sends him to go undercover with the Decepticons in order to get rid of him.
Conan the Barbarian — a sometime companion of Mego Spidey. At times he fights to control his rage, but ultimately fails, with bloody results.
Daredevil — a bungling blind man, with much humor coming from his blindness, and who has unknowingly revealed his identity many times. He also sues Ben Affleck after he "sees" Daredevil. His girlfriend Karen Page is a porn star.
The Defenders — includes the Hulk, the Silver Surfer, Namor, and Dr. Strange; Megoville's most pathetic super-team, who are only called on for menial tasks like getting a cat out of a tree.
Doctor Doom — a pompous megalomaniac who only speaks in the third person and is quick to yell "Curse you, Richards!" (in reference to Mr. Fantastic of the Fantastic Four) when his plans fail. He has launched the Baxter Building into space several times (so many that, at one point, he launches one into space and another falls on him). The word "accursed" is a trademark registered in his name.
Doctor Octopus is a glutton who is rarely seen not eating. He sometimes uses his tentacles to steal from vending machines.
The Gobots — appear from time to time as the pathetic second-stringers of the Transformers. Usually posing as second-stringers to Transformer characters. Cy-kill is shunned from Cobra Commander's Wednesday night game of Risk.
The Green Goblin — working with the publicity and success of the Spider-Man movie, becomes a rich rap artist referring to himself as 'Griz-een Griz-oblin', and performs with his Green Goblin mask on over more traditional rap attire.
Iron Man — a comical drunk, rarely seen sober, a parody of the fact that the real character is a recovering alcoholic. However, after going to rehab and recovering, he attempts to reinstate Prohibition, which causes a "Civil War" to break out, with most of Megoville joining Cap's "Secretly Drunk Avengers". Iron Man returns to his usual drunk self, however, after Hawkeye shoots him with a "booze arrow".
Alan Moore — appears several times in the comic (with a great exaggeration of his hair). Several times he corrects others for mistaking the Man-Thing for the Swamp Thing. On few occasions he states his displeasure about the possibility of writing Watchmen 2.
Northstar — Marvel character well known for being an outed homosexual; usually the target of stereotypical gay jokes. A recurring theme has the X-Man Banshee berating Northstar for being a "poofter" (a slang term for a homosexual), or taking advantage of Daredevil's blindness by trying to make out with him.
Reed Richards — an egotistical supergenius who does not understand the physical and emotional cost of his work. He is also something of an ass, which seems appropriate for one who calls himself "Mr. Fantastic".
Sue Richards — frequently intimated to be sexually promiscuous and has presumably cheated on her husband (Mr. Fantastic) on many occasions (although one Twisted ToyFare Theatre strip declares their original marriage illegal, prompting a new ceremony that ultimately is not completed).
 Spock — totally exasperated, sighs frequently, and realizes the futility of talking sense into Kirk.
The Thing — the "bully" of the Fantastic Four and often plays pranks on other Megoville citizens, generally taking his responsibilities as a superhero far too lightly and often ignoring alert signals and cries for help. He is the constant (albeit usually unknowing) tormentor of a lone creature living in the Negative Zone.
Thor — frequently appears alongside Mego Spidey and the Hulk in the early strips, but later virtually vanishes from the series (the reasons for which is the focus of a later strip). He constantly refers to himself in the third person as "The Odinson" and spouts mangled archaic language in a parody of the source character's manner of speech. He is often intimated as being homosexual because of his long "girly" hair and tendency towards flowery dialogue. During the Megoville Civil War, a clone of Thor is created by Iron Man and Mister Fantastic to fill in the ranks of the pro-prohibition heroes who, in a reference to the Spider-Man Clone Saga, is dressed in the same sweater worn by the Scarlet Spider.
The Troopers, a quartet of Imperial Stormtroopers which consists of a regular Stormtrooper, a Sandtrooper, a Snowtrooper and a Scout Trooper.  In marked contrast to the military bearing and attentiveness to orders of actual Stormtroopers, the Troopers are lazy, sarcastic, and unconcerned with anything except when their shifts end so they can go to the bar.
Wolverine — constantly overworked and wishes that he was less popular. He tends to get into lengthy monologues about how he is "the best he is at what he does...."
The X-Men and the Avengers — star in strips on occasion, but other than the individual members listed above, are most often used to "fill out" crowd and fight scenes.
Charles Xavier — appears to be able to walk just fine, thank you very much.

DC Comics controversy
Many early Twisted ToyFare Theatre strips featured several DC Comics characters, though an early strip entitled "The Super-Friends" featured Spider-man insulting the DC heroes for their ridiculousness.  DC later filed a cease and desist order, preventing Twisted ToyFare Theatre from ever using DC characters. However, Twisted ToyFare Theatre writers not-so-subtly poked fun at this with rare appearances of "Bat-Pumpkin", a Batman Mego figure with his costume re-colored to orange and purple and a pumpkin image replacing the Bat-symbol; even rarer were appearances of a similarly-altered Robin figure as Bat-Pumpkin's sidekick, "Squash".  At other times, Marvel characters shushed DC references ("Ix-nay on the DC oke-jays!"), while in a Matrix parody, Mego Spidey encountered a "Crippled, web-savvy, redheaded secretary." whom he mistakenly thought was the Oracle; she was quick to correct him by saying "Heavens, no!  That would be too close to a DC Comics copyright infringement."

Collections
The strips were reprinted by Wizard Entertainment, the publisher of ToyFare, in collections separate from the magazine. These contained additional content, including behind-the-scenes information on how the stories were written and photographed, and Official Handbook of the Marvel Universe-style biography pages about featured Twisted ToyFare Theatre characters. Wizard published 12 of these collections — 11 regular collections and a special 10th-anniversary collection.

Various toy-collecting celebrities provided introductions for the collected volumes, including Kevin Smith, Seth Green, Stan Lee, Paul Dini, Mark Hamill, Rob Van Dam, "Weird Al" Yankovic, Patton Oswalt, and Joe Quesada.  Jeph Loeb provided the introduction for the Twisted ToyFare Theatre 10th Anniversary Collection.

Robot Chicken connection 
The television show Robot Chicken, which features animated action figures, sprung from Twisted ToyFare Theatre — quite literally, as former writers Tom Root and Douglas Goldstein are head writers for the show, along with fellow Twisted ToyFare Theatre alumnus Matthew Senreich. Robot Chicken producer Seth Green is also an avid toy collector and was a long-time friend of the magazine. He wrote the introduction for one of the Twisted ToyFare Theatre collected editions (actor Mark Hamill, a frequent voice actor on Robot Chicken, also wrote the introduction to one of the collections).

Robot Chicken airs on the Adult Swim portion of Cartoon Network — which, like DC Comics, is owned by WarnerMedia.

See also
List of Twisted ToyFare Theatre stories

References

External links
 Neo-Monster Island - Inspired by and mentioned in Twisted ToyFare Theatre
 Project:Custom - Provider of many of the custom Mego style figures featured in Twisted ToyFare Theatre
 Twisted ToyFare Theatre writer Justin Aclin's "Last Twisted ToyFare Theatre Ever"

1996 comics debuts
2011 comics endings
Parody comics
Comics based on toys
Comics controversies
Action figures
American comic strips